Mirza Mohammadabad (also Romanized as Mīrzā Moḩammadābād) is a village in Garamduz Rural District, Garamduz District, Khoda Afarin County, East Azerbaijan Province, Iran. At the 2006 census, its population was 48, in 9 families.

References 

Populated places in Khoda Afarin County